Charles is a hamlet in the civil parish of East and West Buckland in the North Devon district of Devon, England.

Hamlets in Devon